Filip Nepejchal (born 8 July 1999) is a Czech sports shooter. He competed in the men's 10 metre air rifle event at the 2016 Summer Olympics.

References

External links
 

1999 births
Living people
Czech male sport shooters
Olympic shooters of the Czech Republic
Shooters at the 2016 Summer Olympics
Place of birth missing (living people)
Sportspeople from Kolín
Shooters at the 2019 European Games
European Games medalists in shooting
European Games bronze medalists for the Czech Republic